, also known as Superficial Gossip, is the fourth studio album by Japanese singer-songwriter Ringo Sheena, released on June 24, 2009 in Japan through EMI Music Japan and Virgin Music. The album debuted at number 1 with 120,446 units sold and is certified Gold by the Recording Industry Association of Japan.

Background
It was 2 years and 4 months since she had last released an album under the name Ringo Sheena, and was also the first time in about six years since she released an album on her own because her previous album, Heisei Fūzoku, was released as a joint project with Neko Saito.

Ringo Sheena composed all 14 songs, and she collaborated with various musicians and producers such as Neko Saito, Takayuki Hattori, Masayuki Hiizumi, Ukigumo, Soil & "Pimp" Sessions. 
Each song was given the various elements, such as pop, rock, jazz, hip-hop, and orchestra.

All songs, except 2 songs "Karisome Otome" and "Marunouchi Sadistic," are new compositions. "Karisome Otome (Death Jazz ver.)", released before by digital distribution, is featured on the album and "Marunouchi Sadistic (Expo Ver.)," used as background music at the ending of her concert "Ringo Expo 08", is featured as a bonus track.

The track list is symmetric about the middle song (excluding the bonus track "Marunouchi Sadistic (Expo Ver.)"), as has been the case with all her albums except Muzai Moratorium.

This album title comes from the Gibson SG, an idea which she hit upon before Heisei Fūzoku was completed. Although she was charmed by the shape of the SG, she had not used it. At that time she thought that she would make the album of the jacket using an SG and that started the naming of this album. She associated the word "Sanmon" with "S" and the word "Gossip" with "G", which are her favorite words.

The song "Shun" was covered by R&B musician Daichi Miura on his tour Daichi Miura Live Tour 2010: Gravity on November 20, 2009.

Track listing 

Note
All the official English titles are given at Ringo Sheena's website.

Personnel

Ryūkō
 vocals: Ringo Sheena
 wurlitzer electric piano: Masayuki Hiizumi (Pe'z)
 drums: Kō (Pe'z)
 bass guitars: Masahiro Nirehara (Pe'z)
 electric guitars: Tomoyasu Takeuchi (Maboroshi)
 rap: Daisuke Sakama / Mummy-D (Maboroshi)
 clap: All the members

Rōdōsha
 vocals: Ringo Sheena
 keyboards & backup vocals: Takafumi Ikeda (100s)
 drums & percussions: Tom Tamada (100s)
 bass guitars: Hiroo Yamaguchi (100s)

Mittei Monogatari
 vocals: Ringo Sheena
 organ: Nobuo Kurata
 electric guitars: Masayoshi Furukawa
 upright bass: Hitoshi Watanabe
 drums: Tomoo Tsuruya
 Latin percussions: Masato Kawase
 flute: Hideyo Takakuwa
 trumpet: Koji Nishimura, Hitoshi Yokoyama
 trombone: Yoichi Murata
 alto saxophone: Bob Zung
 tenor saxophone: Osamu Koike
 baritone saxophone: Masakuni Takeno
 vibraphone: Yoshihiko Katori
 conductor: Takayuki Hattori

 Zero Chiten Kara
 vocals, piano & lead synthesizer: Ringo Sheena
 Music sequencer (programming & manipulate): Nobuhiko Nakayama
 electric sitar & guitars: Yukio Nagoshi
 flute, ocarina & bass ocarina: Hideyo Takakuwa

Karisome Otome (DEATH JAZZ ver.)
 vocals: Ringo Sheena
 performance: Soil & "Pimp" Sessions

Tsugō no Ii Karada
vocals: Ringo Sheena
 piano: Hideo Ichikawa
 guitars: Sadanori Nakamure
 bass guitars: Kenji Takamizu
 drums: Shuichi "Ponta" Murakami
 Latin percussions: Mataro Misawa
 classic percussions: Midori Takada
 trumpet: Koji Nishimura, Hitoshi Yokoyama, Masahiko Sugasaka, Mitsukuni Kohata
 trombone: Yoichi Murata, Akira Okumura, Hiroki Hakoyama, Tsutomu Ikeshiro
 alto saxophone: Masakuni Takeno, Kei Suzuki
 tenor saxophone: Koji Shiraishi, Ryoji Ihara
 baritone saxophone: Takuo Yamamoto
 horn: Otohiko Fujita, Kenshow Hagiwara, Yasushi Katumata, Shunsuke Kimura
 tuba: Kiyoshi Sato
 flute: Hideyo Takakuwa, Maiko Seino
 oboe: Satoshi Shoji
 clarinet: Masashi Togame
 bassoon: Osamu Fukui
 harp: Tomoyuki Asakawa
 concert master: Great Eida
 violin: Kojiro Takizawa, Chieko Kinbara, Hitoshi Konno, Takayuki Oshikane, Haruko Yano, Genichiro Nakajima, Tomoko Abe, Tatsuo Ogura, Nagisa Kiriyama, Kioko Miki, Kanako Sakata, Midori Eida, Kon Shirasu, Ayumu Koshikawa, Chizuko Tsunoda
 viola: Yuji Yamada, Toshiki Akiyama, Amiko Watabe, Mayu Takashima, Sachie Onuma, Aiko Hosokawa
 cello: Yoshihiko Maeda, Ayano Kasahara, Masashi Abe, Seigen Tokuzawa, Wataru Mukai, Erika Yokooka
 upright bass: Jun Saito, Teruhiko Saito, Shigeki Ippon, Akio Ando
 conductor: Neko Saito

Shun
 vocals: Ringo Sheena 
 piano: Josei (Soil & "Pimp" Sessions)
 upright bass: Akita Goldman (Soil & "Pimp" Sessions)
 drums: Midorin (Soil & "Pimp" Sessions) 
 concert master: Great Eida
 violin: Kojiro Takizawa, Chieko Kinbara, Haruko Yano, Takayuki Oshikane, Akane Irie, Jou Kuwata, Tomoko Abe, Tatsuo Ogura, Nagisa Kiriyama, Motoko Fujiie, Midori Sakaeda, Kioko Miki, Kon Shirasu, Ayumu Koshikawa, Chizuko Tsunoda
 viola: Toshiki Akiyama, Eriko Kono, Tomoko Shimaoka, Manami Tokudaka, Ruca Suzuki, Mayu Takashima
 cello: Yoshihiko Maeda, Haruki Matsuba, Masaaki Shigematsu, Yutaka Ozawa, Toshiki Fujisawa, Naoko Okisawa
 upright bass: Jun Saito, Teruhiko Saito, Takashi Taninaka, Kazuki Chiba 
 conductor: Neko Saito 

Futari-bocchi Jikan
 vocals: Ringo Sheena
 guitar: Sadanori Nakamure, Fumio Yanagisawa
 upright bass: Kenji Takamizu
 drums: Hideo Yamaki
 Latin percussions: Tamao Fujii, Yuko Takashima
 glockenspiel: Midori Takada
 vibraphone: Marie Oishi
 trumpet: Koji Nishimura, Hitoshi Yokoyama, Masahiro Kobayashi, Mitsuru Tanaka
 trombone: Yoichi Murata, Akira Okumura, Hiroki Sato, Junko Yamashiro
 alto saxophone: Masato Honda, Kei Suzuki
 tenor saxophone: Masakuni Takeno, Osamu Yoshida
 baritone saxophone: Takuo Yamamoto
 conductor: Neko Saito
 tap dance: Kazunori Kumagai

Mayakashi Yasaotoko
 vocals: Ringo Sheena 
 performance: Soil & "Pimp" Sessions

Togatta Teguchi
 vocals: Ringo Sheena
 programming & manipulate: Nobuhiko Nakayama
 electric sitar & guitars: Yukio Nagoshi 
 rap: Mummy-D

Irokoizata
 vocals: Ringo Sheena
 Rhodes piano: Nobuo Kurata
 upright bass: Hitoshi Watanabe
 drums: Tomoo Tsuruya
 guitars: Masayoshi Furukawa
 Latin percussions: Masato Kawase
 trombone: Yoichi Murata
 vibraphone: Yoshihiko Katori
 concert master: Chieko Kinbara
 violin: Haruko Yano, Noriyo Obayashi, Jou Kuwata, Osamu Iyoku, Yukiko Iwato, Great Eida, Nagisa Kiriyama, Yu Manabe, Yuko Okubo, Takayuki Oshikane, Motoko Fujiie
 viola: Yuji Yamada, Takahiro Enokido, Sachie Onuma, Amiko Watabe
 cello: Akio Ueki, Ayano Kasahara
 conductor: Takayuki Hattori

 Bonsai Hada
 vocals: Ringo Sheena
 accordion: coba

Yokyō
 vocals: Ringo Sheena
 guitars: Yukio Nagoshi
 bass guitars: Maki Kitada (Syrup16g)
 drums: Ken-ichi Shirane (Great3)
 chorus & clap: Mayumi Sugiyama, Yuko Sugiyama, Nanae Mizushima, Yumi Ota & Mari Kawashima & Setsuko Kawataki & Rie Byoudo (Kuronekodow)

Marunouchi Sadistic(EXPO Ver.)
 vocals: Ringo Sheena 
 chorus: Ukigumo (Tokyo Jihen)
 bass: Jungo Miura（Petrolz）
 programming: Uni Inoue

Charts and certifications

Charts

Sales and certifications

References

External links 
Ringo Sheena Discography

Ringo Sheena albums
2009 albums
Concept albums